Boisbaudran is a surname. Notable people with the surname include:

 Horace Lecoq de Boisbaudran (1802–1897), French artist and teacher
 Paul Emile Lecoq de Boisbaudran (1838–1912), French chemist